The Episcopal Diocese of Central Pennsylvania is one of the dioceses of the Episcopal Church in the United States of America. It was founded in 1905 as the Diocese of Harrisburg, separating from the original Diocese of Central Pennsylvania now known as the Episcopal Diocese of Bethlehem. 

The seat of the bishop and home of the diocesan offices is St. Stephen's Episcopal Cathedral at 221 North Front Street in Downtown Harrisburg, Pennsylvania.

History
The first boys' choir in the diocese was established at Christ Church in Reading, Pennsylvania during the 1880s.

From October 2006 until May 2014, Nathan D. Baxter was the bishop of the diocese. Following Baxter's retirement Robert Gepert was named as provisional bishop of the diocese.  On 14 March 2015, Audrey Scanlan was elected to become the next bishop of the diocese, and was consecrated in September 2015.

List of Bishops

See also
Christ Episcopal Church (Reading, Pennsylvania)

References

External links

Journal of the Proceedings of the Annual Convention of the Protestant Episcopal Church, Diocese of Central Pennsylvania from 1871 to 1909
Journal of the Annual Convention, Diocese of Harrisburg from 1905 to 1922

 
Central Pennsylvania
Diocese of Central Penn
Province 3 of the Episcopal Church (United States)